Judo at the 2016 Summer Olympics in Rio de Janeiro took place from 6 to 12 August at the Carioca Arena 2 inside the Barra Olympic Park in Barra da Tijuca. Around 386 judoka competed in 14 events (seven each for both men and women).

Qualification

Similar to 2012 format, qualification was based on the world ranking list prepared by International Judo Federation as of May 30, 2016. A total of 252 athletes directly qualified through the ranking with only the top 22 men or top 14 women in each division, ensuring that each NOC was subjected to a limit of one judoka per division.

Competition schedule
There were two sessions of competition on each day of the 2016 Olympic Judo program. The first session (Elimination & Quarterfinal) was conducted from 10:00 to 13:00 BRT, and the second session (repechage, semifinal, Bronze medal and Gold medal) was conducted from 15:30 to 18:10 BRT.

Participating

Participating nations

Competitors

Medal summary

Medal table

Men's events

Women's events

See also
Judo at the 2016 Summer Paralympics

References

External links

 
 
 
 International Judo Federation 
 NBC Olympics: Judo
 Results Book – Judo

 
2016 Summer Olympics events
2016
Olympics
Olympics
Judo competitions in Brazil